George V Bridge (sometimes referred to as King George V Bridge) is a three-arched road bridge over the River Clyde in the city centre of Glasgow, Scotland, named after King George V.

The bridge was designed by Glasgow City Engineer Thomas Somers and built by Melville Dundas & Whitson. It links the southside Tradeston area to Oswald Street in the city Centre. The bridge was commissioned in 1914, but was delayed due to the First World War: the bridge was not completed and opened until 1928. It is now protected as a category B listed building.

Despite its appearance as a masonry bridge, the bridge is actually built of reinforced concrete box girders, faced with Dalbeattie granite.

References

Bridges in Glasgow
Bridges across the River Clyde
Road bridges in Scotland
Listed bridges in Scotland
Category B listed buildings in Glasgow
Gorbals
Bridges completed in 1928
1928 establishments in Scotland